2007–08 Országos Bajnokság I (men's water polo) was the 102nd water polo championship in Hungary.

First stage 

Pld - Played; W - Won; L - Lost; PF - Points for; PA - Points against; Diff - Difference; Pts - Points.

Championship Playoff

European competition Playoff

Relegation Playoff

Final standing

Sources 
Magyar sportévkönyv 2009

Seasons in Hungarian water polo competitions
Hungary
2007 in water polo
2007 in Hungarian sport
2008 in water polo
2008 in Hungarian sport